This is a partial list of molecules that contain 40 to 49 carbon atoms.

C40–C43

C44–C46

C47–C49

See also
 Carbon number

C40